Lizardite is a mineral from the serpentine subgroup with formula , and the most common type of mineral in the subgroup.  It is also a member of the kaolinite-serpentine group.

Lizardite may form a solid-solution series with the nickel-bearing népouite. Intermediate compositions  are possible, with varying proportions of magnesium and nickel. However, the lizardite end-member is much more common than pure népouite, a relatively rare mineral most often formed by the alteration of ultramafic rocks.

Extremely fine-grained, scaly lizardite (also called orthoantigorite) comprises much of the serpentine present in serpentine marbles. It is triclinic, has one direction of perfect cleavage, and may be white, yellow or green. Lizardite is translucent and soft, and may be pseudomorphous after enstatite, olivine or pyroxene, in which case the name bastite is sometimes applied. Bastite may have a silky lustre.

Name 
Lizardite was named by Eric James William Whittaker and Jack Zussman in 1955 after the place it was first reported, the Lizard Peninsula, (from the ) in southern Cornwall, England, United Kingdom. 

Scyelite is a synonym of lizardite.

Characteristics

Chemistry 
Antigorite and lizardite commonly coexist metastably; lizardite may also be able to turn into antigorite at over 350 degrees.

Lizardite contains H2O in excess of the nominal formula, as does chrysotile. It has a high amount of Fe2O3 and a low amount of FeO.

One study found that lizardite has a high amount of SiO2 and a low amount of Al2O3.

Formation 
Lizardite is commonly a result from the hydrothermal metamorphism or retrograde metamorphism of mafic minerals such as olivine, pyroxene or amphibole, in ultrabasic rocks.

Occurrence

Geological occurrence 
Lizardite is commonly found in ophiolite and is often intergrown with brucite. It is also found with magnetite and the other serpentine minerals.

Locations found

Canada 
As of 1989, only a single specimen of lizardite had been found in Mont-Saint-Hilaire, Quebec where it may occur in altered pegmatites.

United States 
Lizardite can be found in the United States. In Pennsylvania It was discovered in the 1960s. With it being the most abundant mineral in Nottingham County Park.

In Minnesota it can be found on the north shore of Lake Superior.

In Montana, the Stillwater igneous complex is a prominent location for the mineral.

United Kingdom 
Lizardite has a type locality at Lizard Peninsula, Cornwall, in the United Kingdom.

Scotland is a notable source of lizardite. Lizardite has been reported in Wales. At Holy Island, Anglesey lizardite has been found to be associated with antigorite.

South Africa 
In the Frank Smith mine located in South Africa, lizardite was the dominant serpentine mineral.

Orange lizardite has been found at the Wessels mine.

Other 
It can also be found in Japan, Italy, and Australia.

References

Serpentine group